Mark Angel may refer to:
 Mark Angel (footballer) (born 1975), English footballer
 Mark Angel (comedian) (born 1991), Nigerian comedian, scriptwriter, and video producer